Exhalimolobos is a genus of flowering plants belonging to the family Brassicaceae.

Its native range is Mexico, Western nd Southern South America.

Species
Species:

Exhalimolobos arabioides 
Exhalimolobos berlandieri 
Exhalimolobos burkartii 
Exhalimolobos hispidulus 
Exhalimolobos palmeri 
Exhalimolobos parryi 
Exhalimolobos pazensis 
Exhalimolobos polyspermus 
Exhalimolobos weddellii

References

Brassicaceae
Brassicaceae genera